Finnikin of the Rock is a 2009 young adult fantasy novel by Melina Marchetta. It follows the story of Finnikin of the Rock and his guardian who have been away from home for ten years, since the royal family was killed. But when he is told that the heir to the throne is still alive they must follow a young woman, Evanjalin, in order to reach the prince.

Background
Finnikin of the Rock was first published in Australia on 29 September 2008 by Viking Press in trade paperback format. In February 2010 it was released by Candlewick Press in the United States in hardback format. Finnikin of the Rock won the 2008 Aurealis Award for best young-adult novel and the 2009 Australian Book Industry Awards Older Readers award. It was also a short-list nominee for the 2009 CBCA Book of the Year: Older Readers award.

Plot

Finnikin, Sir Topher and Evanjalin start travelling to Sorel, Finnikin reluctantly. Sir Topher tells Evanjalin the story of the Five Days of Unspeakable. Later, they travel to a town in Sarnak. Finnikin and Evanjalin go to the market to buy food. A boy thief steals Evanjalin's ruby ring. Evanjalin runs after the thief. She chases him into an alleyway but there are four men there. Finnikin comes and they both start fighting the men.

Evanjalin and Finnikin fight the men, then steal a horse and ride to Sir Topher. They see the thief again and Finnikin brings him to their camp. In the following days, the group reaches Charyn. They come to an exile camp and a man tells them that Lord August wants Finnikin and Sir Topher to travel to Belegonia. At Belegonia, Finnikin and Sir Topher ask Lord August to ask the Belegonian king to spare a piece of land for the Lumateran exiles.

Lord August says that he will only help them if they provide him with information that the king doesn't already know. Evanjalin tells him that Charyn wanted to take over Lumatere, which was between Charyn and Belegonia, so that it could take over Belegonia. The group takes a ship to Sorel and they reach there. They talk but then soldiers come and Evanjalin says that Finnikin is pretending to be Balthazar. Finnikin is arrested.

In the Sorel mines, Trevanion is visited by Evanjalin who tells him that Finnikin is also in the mines. Finnikin sees his father again, Trevanion. Together they make a plan to escape. Meanwhile, Evanjalin and Sir Topher find out that their horse has been stolen. They see it in the market and Evanjalin trades the thief for it.  Finnikin and his father fight the guards and manage to get out of the mines. They reach Evanjalin and Sir Topher but Trevanion does not trust Evanjalin.

Main characters

Finnikin – the protagonist of the story. He is strong, brave, intelligent and sometimes strong headed. All these qualities are what make him Trevanion's son.

Trevanion – Finnikin's father and captain of the King's Guard. After the curse was cast upon Lumatere, he was captured along with his hand-picked guard, they were sent to work in the mines of their neighbouring countries. He hasn't seen his son Finnikin since then.

Sir Topher – Finnikin's guardian while his father remains in the mines. Sir Topher was tutor to the heir of Lumatere.

Prince Balthazar. The heir to the throne of Lumatere, Finnikin's childhood friend.

Evanjalin – A novice of the goddess Lagrami who joins Finnikin and his guardian Sir Topher on their quest to build a second Lumatere. She leads them to believe that Prince Balthazar, the heir to the throne of Lumatere, is alive and that they may return.

Froi – A thief whom Evanjalin and Finnikin meet on their journey. He has a nasty attitude which worsens when Evanjalin enslaves him, but slowly starts to become better throughout the story.

Critical reception
A.T. Ross, writing for Fantasy Book Review, noted: "Finnikin of the Rock is an unusual fantasy novel, but that does not mean it is lacklustre. It is more of an extended fairy tale in atmosphere and story than a pure 'fantasy' in the way the genre is today normally conceived. This makes it a fresh entry into a genre often beset by copycat stories; if there is anything Finnikin of the Rock is copying, it is the dark fairy tale feel of the Brothers Grimm."

Inspiration
Marchetta has stated that the cloister of Lagrami in the novel is based on the French island fortress of Mont Saint-Michel.

Notes
 Dedication: "For Marisa and Daniela, because I've always loved being a Marchetta sister..."

References

2008 Australian novels
Australian young adult novels
Australian fantasy novels
Young adult fantasy novels
Novels by Melina Marchetta
Aurealis Award-winning works